Łukasz Cichos (born June 2, 1982) is a retired Polish footballer.

External links 
 

1982 births
Living people
Polish footballers
People from Konin
Sportspeople from Greater Poland Voivodeship
Association football forwards
Bruk-Bet Termalica Nieciecza players
Znicz Pruszków players
Korona Kielce players
KSZO Ostrowiec Świętokrzyski players
Jarota Jarocin players
Aluminium Konin players
Tur Turek players
Siarka Tarnobrzeg players
Radomiak Radom players
Polish football managers